Love, Mother is a 1987 Hungarian drama film directed by János Rózsa. It was entered into the 15th Moscow International Film Festival where Dorottya Udvaros won the award for Best Actress.

Cast
 Dorottya Udvaros as Kalmár Juli
 Róbert Koltai as Kalmár Géza
 Sándor Gáspár as Doki
 Kati Lajtai as Kalmár Mari
 Simon Gévai as Peti Kalmár (as Gévai G. Simon)
 Péter Andorai as Csezmiczey
 Ildikó Bánsági as Osztályfõnökn&otilde
 Erika Bodnár as Szomszédasszony
 Zsuzsa Töreky as Szeretõ
 Judit Pogány as Vendég asszony
 Frigyes Hollósi as Vendég férfi

References

External links
 

1987 films
1987 drama films
Hungarian drama films
1980s Hungarian-language films